The Clique is a young adult novel series written by Canadian author Lisi Harrison and originally published by Little, Brown and Company, a subsidiary of the Hachette Group. The series was reprinted by Poppy books. The series revolves around five girls: Massie Block, Alicia Rivera, Dylan Marvil, Kristen Gregory, and Claire Lyons, who are known as The Pretty Committee. The Pretty Committee is a popular clique at the fictional, all-girls middle school, Octavian Country Day (OCD). Claire and her family move from Orlando, Florida to Westchester, New York, where they live in the Blocks' guesthouse. Claire is initially considered an outcast due to her financial and fashion status. As the series progresses, Claire slowly develops a friendship with Massie, realizing that she must earn her friendship, and eventually becomes a member of the group.

The first novel, The Clique, was released on May 19, 2004. As of June 2012, 14 novels have been released in the main series. On October 4, 2006, a box set called "The Clique Collection" was released containing the first three novels of the series. A second set was released in November 2006 containing books four through six.  From April to August 2008, five novellas named after the five main characters were published in a subseries called "The Clique Summer Collection." The novellas focus on each title characters' activities during the summer between their seventh and eighth grades in school. Harrison composed a guide to the series' "teen speak" terminology and trivia, Cliquetionary, which was released on November 16, 2009. It was announced on Lisi Harrison's website that the fourteenth book (which was released February 15, 2011) would mark the end of the series.

In 2007, Warner Brothers announced that it had partnered with publisher Alloy Entertainment to create a series of direct-to-DVD films based on the books. A film, based on the first novel The Clique, was released on November 11, 2008. The novels are being adapted into a series of graphic novels by Yen Press, with the first volume released July 2010, with art by Yishan Li. The video game The Clique: Diss and Make-Up is based on the book series. The books have a spin-off series, Alphas.

History
The book-packaging subdivision of Alloy Online, which focuses on the teen market, conceived the series after becoming interested in developing an in-house franchise. They approached Lisi Harrison, who was working as a writer for MTV, about producing a series of youth novels. She said of this proposal, "Always being a closeted wannabe author - I jumped at the opportunity. I loved the idea." Harrison actually wrote this book as a "joke", highlighting that she had named the high school "OCD"–akin to a disease known as obsessive–compulsive disorder, commonly abbreviated as OCD. She created this series to show everyone that popular people aren't perfect and that everyone has flaws. Alloy's involvement in the process of writing varies from series to series; Harrison said that in her case they functioned as a sounding board, but otherwise, "they left me to my own devices. It's very much my book." The result was the first novel in the series, The Clique, which was published in May 2004 by Little, Brown and Company.

Characters

Massie Block is the alpha (leader) and founder of  her clique, The Pretty Committee. She has glossy brown hair and amber eyes. She is bossy and stuck-up, and her greatest desire is to be better than most people, but there is a sweeter side to her. Her family is rich because her dad is a successful businessman, so Massie gets everything she wants, though the Block family becomes temporarily bankrupt when her dad loses his job. She loves shopping, and has a large number of designer clothes and credit cards. She has dated Derrick "Derrington" Harrington and Landon Crane. Although she acts like she has no flaws, she has an insecure side that she usually only reveals to her black Pug, Bean, and sometimes her friends, mostly Claire. 
Alicia Rivera is described as the most beautiful girl at OCD, with dark, glossy hair, big brown eyes, and a huge chest, which she is infamously known for. It's later revealed she has had Breast augmentation surgery. She loves gossiping, and she eventually becomes the morning announcer at OCD. She also loves to dance, and takes lessons at Body Alive Dance Studio. She loves all things Ralph Lauren. She lives in a fancy mansion with her ex-model mother Nadia, and her famous lawyer dad, Len. Alicia has always wanted to be a leader like Massie, but she can never quite pull it off, which irritates her. She had a major crush on Josh Hotz, a guy who has a Ralph Lauren obsession like she does. They date briefly, but Alicia dumps him when she realizes they wear the same size clothes. Alicia is hinted to be the new alpha in the last book, when Massie moves to England, in "A Tale of Two Pretties. 
Dylan Marvil is Massie's "second-in-command". She is the Pretty Committee's source to the celebrity world, for her mother is Merri-Lee Marvil, the famous talk show host and television personality for the Daily Grind. Dylan has two sisters, Ryan and Jaime, who aren't really mentioned or seen except for in "Charmed and Dangerous: The Rise of the Pretty Committee" and in "A Tale Of Two Pretties," where they star in their own reality show called "Marvil-ous Marvils" along with Dylan and their mom. Dylan has long, red hair and green eyes, and worries constantly about her weight, even though she is described to have a good body. She wears a size 6. 
Kristen Gregory is an all-star soccer player at school. She is a bit of a tomboy but loves designer clothes. Her mother disapproves of the racy clothing that Kristen likes, which is why they don't get along too well. However, despite her mother's objections, Kristen still wears the clothing behind her mother's back. Kristen's dad lost all of his money before the series began, which causes her to become poor, and she doesn't want anyone to know. She tells Claire about the secret on an instant messaging service, thinking she was confessing to Massie. She eventually tells the others in the third book, "Revenge of the Wannabes".  Kristen is highly intelligent, attending OCD on a full scholarship, until the book "The Pretty Committee Strikes Back", when she is expelled. She is considered to be pretty with her long blond hair and blue eyes, although in "Invasion of the Boy-Snatchers" a disastrous hair appointment leaves her with a short pixie cut. She enjoys playing word games and is very athletic. In the Summer Books, it is revealed Kristen is the leader of The Witty Committee, an Anti-Pretty Committee group that strives upon intelligence and character. she is the founder of their lip gloss company that turned out to be a fail.  In the group they dress up as intelligent people in history, and Kristen chooses to be Cleopatra. Several other students, including Claire's best friend Layne Abeley, are in the group. When Massie finds out about The Witty Committee, she and Kristen's friendship is temporarily ended, but Kristen regains Massie's approval later on. 
Claire Lyons moved from Orlando, Florida to Westchester, New York. Her dad was good friends with Massie's dad in college, and the Lyons are living in Massie's guesthouse. Claire's family is not rich or successful like the other girls' families are, so she has a hard time fitting in at first, but eventually does. She becomes friends with Layne, known to the Pretty Committee as an LBR (Loser Beyond Repair). In the end, Massie leaves telling Claire, "I heart you." Her trademark is her love of Keds, Gummies and Sours and her crush on Cam Fisher, and thanks to the encouragement and acceptance from her former bully, Massie Block, she is not only allowed to be in The Clique, but to also be in a relationship with Cam and be friends with Layne at the same time, so she is reasonably liked and respected by her peers. Claire is described as having blonde hair with short bangs and wide blue eyes. She briefly leaves the Pretty Committee in favor of two freshman Drama-Club Girls, Cara and Syd, and when earning the lead role in a blockbuster movie, Dial L for Loser. She has trouble fitting in because of her sense of style or her personality. Claire is known to be down-to-earth and loyal. She is best friends with Sarah, Sari and Mandy, who are in Florida, but soon learns in her summer book that Sarah, Sari and Mandy secretly hate her, so she votes Massie to win the beauty pageant instead of them, preferring to be friends with Massie, Alicia, Dylan and Kristen, where she feels accepted and more herself.

List of novels

The Summer Books

Other Clique Books

Reception
The Clique was selected as a "Quick Pick For Reluctant Young Adult Readers" by YALSA. Best Friends for Never was nominated for the 2005 Quill Awards in the "Young Adult/Teen" category.  Best Friends for Never reached The New York Times bestseller list in early February 2005, four months after it was published, but remained there only one week. It returned in late February for another week, reaching #7. Following the release of the next volume in the series, It entered the bestseller list again in late March, where it stayed another week, then in late April, where it remained for three weeks. In late March it also made an appearance on the Publishers Weekly bestseller list, coming in at #9. Copies of the novel have continued to sell in large numbers: nearly 150,000 in 2005, over 200,000 in 2006, and over 150,000 in 2007.

Three of the novels from the "Summer Collection", Alicia, Dylan, and Massie, made the New York Times' Children's Books best seller list. On June 22, 2008, Alicia debuted on the list in first place, with Dylan and Massie placing second and sixth, respectively.

Critical reviews
In reviewing the first novel, The Clique, reviewers remarked on the behavior of the characters, with Publishers Weekly noting that it "takes cliquish, snobbish behavior to Hollywood extremes" and School Library Journal saying that "the cruelty of the clique [is not] redeemed with any sort of a satisfying ending." There were also comments about the novel's use of brand names: School Library Journal said that it "has trendy references kids will love"; Booklist expounded more on the subject, saying that the novel goes into "too much detail about how the super wealthy live" but added that it "has fun with the tyranny of brand names" - although they also cautioned that "the very specifics that teens will recognize will be 'so out' before the year is over." Additionally, Booklist described the instant messaging segments as "hilarious", while School Library Journal criticized "the shallowness of the characters" and "the one-dimensional plot". Spero News says "At first, it's easy to hate this book and the shallow materialism that these characters embody. On the other hand, they're so impossible to take seriously that you have to laugh at them. These girls are so 13-going-on-30."

Reviewers' general descriptions of Best Friends for Never focused on its lightweight nature and entertainment value: Book Loons called it "good soap operatic fun", The Virginian Pilot said it was "a fairly quick and easy read", Teen Reads found it to be "another quick, fun, enjoyable read", while Romantic Times thought that it was "sinful, nasty fun" and gave it three stars. More negative comments that were made included The Virginian Pilot'''s assertion that it "lacks the sophistication and style of deeper novels". On the behavior of the characters—something the first volume was criticized for—Romantic Times said, "Good news for fans—the girls are just as catty now as they were before." Book Loons added that it "does capture both the occasionally unpleasant verbal interactions and emotional vulnerability of pre-teen girls." The book's cliffhanger ending was described as "perfect" by Teen Reads and according to The Virginian Pilot'' is, along with the "mild twists", what made the novel an "interesting read."

References 

 
Book series introduced in 2004
Canadian novels adapted into films
Canadian young adult novels
Lagardère SCA franchises
Little, Brown and Company books
Novels set in New York (state)
Novels set in high schools and secondary schools
Young adult novel series
Alloy Entertainment